Luis Cosculluela (born 23 September 1939) is a Spanish politician who served as Minister of Territorial Administration from July to December 1982.

References

1939 births
Living people
University of Barcelona alumni
Government ministers of Spain
20th-century Spanish politicians